Shinobido: Way of the Ninja   is a stealth video game developed by Acquire and released for the PlayStation 2 in 2005.

Plot

Story
Shinobido has the player take the role of an amnesiac ninja who wakes to find himself lying on the bank of an unfamiliar river.  In fact, everything is unfamiliar, as the man finds that he can no longer remember his identity and has no memory of his life or situation up until the point of his regaining consciousness.  Finding only a sword lying next to him on the ground, the man stumbles across an isolated and seemingly derelict shack, only to have an arrow shoot past his head and lodge itself into the shack's outer wall.  Startled, the man scans the trees and undergrowth surrounding him, but then notices a letter attached to the arrow.  The letter states that the person who wrote it is simply  a "concerned bystander," and further identifies the amnesiac man as "Goh," a ninja of the Asuka clan, which was wiped out the previous day.  The letter informs Goh that his memories and soul have somehow been stolen and placed within eight mystical stones which were scattered during the initial attack on the Asuka ninjas' village, and then further scattered by people who have located and claimed the stones.

Using the run-down hut as a base-of-operations, Goh must locate the stones to reclaim his memory and discover the truth regarding the destruction of the Asuka ninja.  However, this monumental task would prove impossible without the assistance of powerful and knowledgeable allies, and Goh is advised by the mysterious writer of the letter to gain the trust and protection of one of three powerful warlords and charismatic leaders within his proximity.  Goh is further advised to begin his search in Utakata Castle, where the kind and noble Nobutero Ichijo resides. Ichijo and the Asuka ninja apparently together maintained peace throughout Utakata. With the destruction of the latter, Utakata now appears on the brink of war as ambitious neighbouring warlords and religious leaders turn their attention towards the vulnerable province. Goh must decide whether he will trust Ichijo, or instead ally himself with one of the other leaders vying for control of the region.

Gameplay

Missions
The player takes control of the Asuka ninja, as Goh, "The Crow", who conducts various missions and tasks, primarily stealth-based, for one of three warlords competing for Goh's allegiance. Missions include assassination, escort duty, protection, theft, kidnap, and various other clandestine operations at the request of the lords, and are delivered by a mysterious individual who shoots a message-carrying arrow into the wall of Goh's shack, the usual method of notification, used throughout the game. Generally, several missions will be available to the player at any given time, and will sometimes involve locating and claiming one of the eight stones containing Goh's memories and soul, after gaining the trust of a particular lord, who will advise of the stone's whereabouts. The character is guided by the mysterious "Onji", who helps him in his search for the truth, for his memories and for the greater evil that threatens Utakata.

Abilities
As a ninja, Goh is swift, agile, and silent, and can use these attributes to his benefit during missions.  Although Goh is a capable combatant, he will generally be at a disadvantage in a straight sword fight, as his opponents are larger in number and are often more skillfully trained in direct kenjutsu than he is.  Goh will encounter heavily-armoured rival ninja, skilled yojimbo, ronin warriors, and large groups of an opposing lord's regular guardsmen, who will often call for reinforcements or sound the alert if they become aware of Goh's presence. It is very much in Goh's favour to utilise stealth tactics to avoid detection, such as crouching behind ledges and walls, climbing across rooftops, and sneaking through canals. Such tactics will allow Goh to accomplish his tasks with minimal interference, or until the enemy can be picked off slowly and silently, one-by-one.

Stealth attacks
Goh is capable of using the landscape to his advantage. By running along walls, leaping the space between rooftops, or by being hidden behind obstacles or by rainy weather, Goh can perform a "stealth kill" on an unsuspecting opponent. If Goh is spotted or heard, the enemy may deflect or prevent the attack. For example, if an opponent catches sight of Goh just as he creeps up from behind to slit his throat, he may grab Goh's arm and struggle for his life, with Goh still able to make the kill under the right conditions, depending on the opponent's strength and alertness. There are many types of stealth kills available to the player, and some cannot be prevented by the enemy. Using railings, pools of water, or when enemies are distracted into examining items left lying around will present Goh with the greatest opportunities for a stealth kill.  Goh can then carry fallen enemies or allies into shadowy corners, or drop them down wells or into rivers, to prevent the enemy from finding the bodies and sounding a general alert.

Onscreen indicators
Just as the Tenchu series did before it, Shinobido uses a type of "Ki Meter". However, where Tenchu uses a number-based system to judge the distance and awareness of an opponent, Shinobido uses a colour-based system to judge the enemy's status. When approaching an opponent or group of opponents, a pair of eyes will appear at the top of the screen, with an individual set of eyes for each enemy within Goh's range. If the eyes are grey, the enemy is unaware of Goh's presence. Purple eyes indicate that the guard has become alert or cautious due to a noise or having seen something in the distance.  Red will indicate that the opponent has identified Goh or one of Goh's allies and is closing to attack.  Orange indicates that the enemy has lost sight of Goh, but is still attempting to locate him. The shape of the border around the eyes indicates an individual's status, with different shaped borders for enemies, changed to show danger presented, and allies.

Strategy and tactics
The open-ended nature of Shinobido allows the player to continue the game for as long as they wish to do so. The game can only advance and finish as the player selects specific missions. If the player continues to select alternative missions rather than those necessary to advance through gameplay, the war can effectively be sustained indefinitely or until the player decides to eliminate two of the warring factions and locate all of the mystic stones. Due to this style of gameplay, missions take place in pivotal strategic locations throughout Utakata rather than on uniquely specific levels. These locations include commercial hubs such as Sengen Town and Ryonin Market, transport routes such as Dandala Peak and Rokudo Valley, and the strongholds of each individual warlord, such as Fudo Castle and Sotai Tower. One mission may have Goh attempting to sabotage a transport cart full of food or weapons bound for the front by attacking the convoy in Rokudo Valley, whilst the next mission may have Goh returning to the same location to exterminate a group of barbarians who are attacking allied convoy shipments.

There are pseudo-realtime ramifications to various tactics. For example, if there is no rice (if the player stole it or destroyed the cart transporting it) for a particular warlord, their soldiers will be less focused, weaker, and much less dangerous, repeatedly complaining about their severe hunger and alerting Goh to their positions. If the player opts not to eliminate a rampaging bear in the mountain or forest regions surrounding Utakata in one mission, the beast will likely find its way into the town settlements, leaving the player the responsibility of rectifying the resulting chaos at a later point in gameplay.

Interactions with the feudal lords are important. The player may be required to carry out a mission in one lord's castle, at the behest of another lord, although this mission will not involve contact or interaction with said opposing lord in any way. One lord will write haikus, another will conduct prayer ceremonies, etc. Due to this fact, the player may decide not to comply with the objectives of a given contract, and instead choose act for their own ends. One example would be accepting a contract to steal food, money, or documents from the castle of one lord and transporting them to the lord contracting Goh's services. Instead, the player may assassinate the lord occupying the castle. Stealing provisions, assassinating enemies and allies alike in secret, and gaining a lord's complete trust so as to eliminate him later is all quite possible. However, such actions require prudent planning and a certain level of skill on the player's part. Nevertheless, the previously set objectives can fail or succeed, with Goh's trust with the contracting lord increasing or decreasing depending on the player's choices. The player's imagination and ability are what govern the ability to drive a faction toward famine and ruin, or toward power and prosperity.

Witnesses can also be problematic for Goh. Should Goh choose to accept a contract from one lord against another for whom Goh has worked on other occasions, the second lord will feel personally betrayed and likely request their troops hunt down and execute Goh. This can become especially tedious if said lord consistently contracts rival ninja or barbarians to attack Goh's hideout. Failure to fend off these attackers will result in Goh's hard-earned money and items being stolen by the enemy, although successfully remaining hidden and earning an "Invisible" rank at the end of each mission will prevent this from occurring to some extent.

Development

After the Tenchu series was lost to rival Japanese developer From Software, Acquire began development on a new series with similar style and gameplay values in an effort to retain its stealth/ninja genre fan base.

Shinobido Takumi expansion pack
The game's success in Japan spawned an expansion pack which was released exclusively to the Japanese market. The pack, entitled Shinobido Takumi and released in June 2006, contains 130 fan-made missions which have been judged and selected by the Spike development staff to be the best on offer.  The creators of the submitted missions chosen by the development team received in-game credit, a copy of the game and an additional commemorative bonus item.

Reception

The game received "mixed" reviews according to the review aggregation website Metacritic. Critics and reviewers criticised the game's awkward control system, which would at times cause the player to accidentally be noticed by an enemy when attempting a sneak-attack or stealth kill, and also the lack of variety between missions. On the other hand, critics praised the unique story, ragdoll physics and open-ended system which allowed players to choose their allegiance and style of mission, be it stealth or all-out attack. The English language voice acting is described by Boomtown's reviewer as "patchy", adding that "some of it works, most of it doesn’t". In Japan, Famitsu gave it a score of one eight, one nine, one eight, and one nine for a total of 34 out of 40.

Other media
Another title in the series, Shinobido: Tales of the Ninja, is available on the PlayStation Portable. Acquire stated and apologized on its official website that, due to circumstances beyond their control, there was no planned North American release. A sequel to the PlayStation Portable game, titled Shinobido 2: Revenge of Zen, was released for the PlayStation Vita.
 
A female version of Goh appears as a guest character in the 2021 crossover game, Neptunina X Senran Kagura: Ninja Wars

Notes

References

External links
Shinobido: Way of the Ninja official website 
Shinobido: Imashime official website 
Shinobido: Imashime ACQUIRE site 

Shinobido: Takumi
Shinobido: Takumi official website 
Shinobido: Takumi ACQUIRE site 
Shinobido: Homura
Shinobido: Homura official website 
Shinobido: Homura ACQUIRE site 
ACQUIRE Games 

2005 video games
Video games about ninja
PlayStation 2 games
PlayStation 2-only games
Sengoku video games
Kadokawa Dwango franchises
Sony Interactive Entertainment games
Stealth video games
Video games developed in Japan
Video games featuring female protagonists
Video games scored by Hideki Sakamoto
Video games set in castles
Video games with expansion packs
Video games about amnesia
Acquire (company) games
Single-player video games